Thomas O'Donohue (born 12 December 1887, Kilmihil, Ireland. Died 6 November 1951) was an Irish athlete who competed in the 1912 Summer Olympics for Great Britain and Ireland. He finished 23rd in the high jump competition. In the Olympic trials he tied for first with Howard Baker.

Thomas worked in Liverpool Customs and Excise. He married D. Molloy from Donegal. During his life he lived in Leixlip and later Griffith Avenue Dublin. He had 6 children, 4 girls and 2 boys.

His personal best was 1.8m in high jump on 5 November 1912 but he only achieved 1.7m in the 1912 Olympics. His personal best was 6.37m in long jump, achieved on 20 November 1912.

References

External links
 List of Irish athletes at 1912 Olympics

1887 births
1951 deaths
Irish male high jumpers
Athletes (track and field) at the 1912 Summer Olympics
Olympic athletes of Great Britain